The 2019–20 season was the 121st season of the English Football League (EFL) and the fourth season under that name after it was renamed from The Football League in 2016. For the seventh season running, the league was sponsored by Sky Betting & Gaming and was therefore known as the Sky Bet EFL.

The EFL is contested through three divisions: the Championship, League One and League Two. The winner and the runner up of the Championship are automatically promoted to the Premier League along with the winner of the Championship playoff. Originally the bottom two teams in League Two were to be relegated to the National League, but because of the expulsion of Bury from League One, only the bottom team in League Two was relegated.

Promotion and relegation

From the Premier League
 Relegated to the Championship
Cardiff City
Fulham
Huddersfield Town

From the Championship
 Promoted to the Premier League
Norwich City
Sheffield United
Aston Villa
 Relegated to League One
Rotherham United
Bolton Wanderers
Ipswich Town

From League One
 Promoted to the Championship
Luton Town
Barnsley
Charlton Athletic
 Relegated to League Two
Plymouth Argyle
Walsall
Scunthorpe United
Bradford City

From League Two
 Promoted to League One
Lincoln City
Bury
Milton Keynes Dons
Tranmere Rovers
 Relegated to the National League
Notts County
Yeovil Town

From the National League
 Promoted to League Two
Leyton Orient
Salford City

Championship

Table

Play-offs

Results

League One

Table

Play-offs

Results

League Two

Table

Play-offs

Results

Managerial changes

References

 
2019-20